David Allen Conway (born 17 February 1950) is a British music historian, academic and writer.

Early life
Conway was born in London. His sister was Barbara Conway who became a journalist. He was educated at Haberdashers' Aske's Boys' School, and studied economics and psychology as an undergraduate at King's College, Cambridge. He obtained a PhD degree under the supervision of John Klier at University College London, where he has been an Honorary Research Fellow since 2008.

Career
In the 1980s, Conway and his Czechoslovak-born wife Nadia were elected councillors of the London Borough of Enfield. From 1991 to 2016, he acted as a Senior Expert for the European Commission in development aid projects in the countries of the former Soviet Union. His 2012 book Jewry in Music was published by Cambridge University Press. It "analyses why and how Jews, virtually absent from western art music until the end of the eighteenth century, came to be represented in all branches of the profession as leading figures – not only as composers and performers, but as publishers, impresarios and critics." The book was positively reviewed by musicologist Tina Frühauf and on the BBC Radio programme Music Matters.

Conway is a founder and director of the music festival Levočské babie leto in Levoča, Slovakia. Since 2018 he has been Chair of the opera company HGO (formerly Hampstead Garden Opera).

In the academic year 2019–20 Conway was a Polonsky Visiting Fellow at Oxford University.  He contributes to journals including Slavonic and East European Review, The Wagner Journal and Jewish Renaissance.

Publications
Conway's publications include:
Jewry in Music: Entry to the Profession from the Enlightenment to Richard Wagner (2012). Cambridge: Cambridge University Press. .
"A New Song" in The Cambridge Companion to Jewish Music, ed. Joshua Walden (2015). Cambridge: Cambridge University Press. .
 "The Real Faust: Heine's Faust Ballet Scenario 1846–1948", in The Oxford Handbook of Faust in Music, ed. Lorna Fitzsimmons and Charles McKnight (2019). Oxford: Oxford University Press. .
 "Spontini's Complaint", in Judaism in Opera, ed. I. Schmid-Reider and A. Cahn, Regensburg: Conbrio Verlag (2017)..

References

Notes

Sources

1950 births
Living people
Writers from London
British music historians
Alumni of King's College, Cambridge
Alumni of University College London
People educated at Haberdashers' Boys' School
Historians of Jews and Judaism
Conservative Party (UK) councillors
Councillors in Greater London